Events from the year 1562 in India.

Events
 Baz Bahadur's reign as the last sultan of Malwa ends and brings the sultanate to a close

Births

Deaths
 Maldeo Rathore (born c 1511), rulers of Marwar dies

See also

 Timeline of Indian history